State Road 151 (SR 151), now County Road 151 (CR 151), is a former state route in northeastern Leon County, Florida.

Beginning at the junction of SR 265 and Seventh Avenue, the route travels northeast along Centerville Road and Moccasin Gap Road across Capital Circle to CR 142 (Old Magnolia Road) east of Miccosukee.

West of CR 59, CR 151 is a designated canopy road over which trees have been allowed to extend their branches.

Major intersections

See also

List of former state roads in Florida

References

External links
FDOT Map of Leon County

County roads in Leon County, Florida
Former state highways in Florida
Transportation in Tallahassee, Florida